Aëria, (minor planet designation: 369 Aëria) provisional designation , is a metallic asteroid and the parent body of the Aeria family. It orbits in the central region of the asteroid belt, rotates every 4.778 hours and measures approximately 65 kilometers in diameter. The asteroid was discovered on 4 July 1893, by French astronomer Alphonse Borrelly at the Marseille Observatory in southeastern France. It was named for "Air", one of the four classical elements: earth, water, air and fire.

Orbit and classification 

Aëria is the parent body of the Aeria family, a small asteroid family of less than 300 known members, while he Lightcurve Data Base dynamically groups it to the much larger Eunomia family. Named members of the Aeria family include 1184 Gaea, 3324 Avsyuk, 130066 Timhaltigin and 144303 Mirellabreschi.

Aëria orbits the Sun in the central main-belt at a distance of 2.4–2.9 AU once every 4 years and 4 months (1,577 days). Its orbit has an eccentricity of 0.10 and an inclination of 13° with respect to the ecliptic. The body's observation arc begins at Marseille on 6 July 1893, two nights after its official discovery observation.

Physical characteristics 

In the Tholen classification, Aëria is a metallic M-type asteroid. This agrees with the more generic X-type, assigned to members of the Aeria family.

Rotation period 

Several rotational lightcurves of Aëria have been obtained from photometric observations since 1984, when it was first observed at ESO's La Silla Observatory in Chile. Lightcurve analysis gave a consolidated rotation period of 4.778 hours with a brightness amplitude between 0.04 and 0.13 magnitude.

Diameter and albedo 

According to the surveys carried out by the Infrared Astronomical Satellite IRAS, the Japanese Akari satellite and the NEOWISE mission of NASA's Wide-field Infrared Survey Explorer, Aëria measures between 60.00 and 73.77 kilometers in diameter and its surface has an albedo between 0.127 and 0.1919.

The Collaborative Asteroid Lightcurve Link adopts the results obtained by IRAS, that is, an albedo of 0.1919 and a diameter of 60.0 kilometers based on an absolute magnitude of 8.52.

Occultation events 

Aëria has been observed by astronomers during at least two occultation events: the first in December 2015 and the other in February 2018. These provided information on the size and shape of the asteroid.

Naming 

This minor planet was named after "Air", one of the four classical elements: earth, water, air and fire. It is thought that the asteroid's name may have also been inspired by the two letters of its provisional designation, .

References

External links 
 Asteroid Lightcurve Database (LCDB), query form (info )
 Dictionary of Minor Planet Names, Google books
 Asteroids and comets rotation curves, CdR – Observatoire de Genève, Raoul Behrend
 Discovery Circumstances: Numbered Minor Planets (1)-(5000) – Minor Planet Center
 
 

000369
Discoveries by Alphonse Borrelly
Named minor planets
000369
18930704